Lake Wohlen (German: Wohlensee) is a reservoir in the Canton of Berne, Switzerland. Its surface is approximately 3.65 km² and its maximum depth is 20 m. It lies between the towns of Bremgarten bei Bern and Mühleberg. Lake Wohlen was completed in 1920.

See also
List of lakes of Switzerland

External links

Wohlen
Wohlen
RWohlen